The Stadio Olimpico (English: Olympic Stadium) is the largest sports facility in Rome, Italy, seating over 70,000 spectators. It is located within the Foro Italico sports complex, north of the city. The structure is owned by the Italian National Olympic Committee and it is used primarily for association football. The Stadio Olimpico is the home stadium of the Roma and Lazio football clubs, and also hosts the Coppa Italia final. The Italian Rugby Union team also use the stadium for their home matches. It was rebuilt for the 1990 FIFA World Cup and it hosted the tournament final.

Despite being an Olympic stadium, therefore ostensibly dedicated exclusively to sport, musical concerts are also held, in particular the concert by Claudio Baglioni on 6 June 1998, which still holds the record attendance at the Olimpico with a total of over 100,000 spectators, thanks to the fact that the stage was located in the center of the stadium and the public surrounded it filling all the seats.

Rated an UEFA category four stadium, it has also hosted four European Cup/Champions League finals, the most recent being the 2009 UEFA Champions League Final. Outside football, the stadium is used by the Italian national rugby union team and it is Italy's national athletics stadium. Occasionally, it hosts concerts and events.

History
Throughout its history, the Stadio Olimpico has undergone several renovations.

1937, the Stadio dei Cipressi 
In its first stages, the Stadio Olimpico was called the Stadio dei Cipressi. It was designed and constructed within the larger project of the Foro Mussolini (Mussolini Forum) which was renamed Foro Italico after the war.

Construction work began in 1927 directed by the Turinese engineer Angelo Frisa and architect Enrico Del Debbio. The construction was completed in 1932, after a few variations to the original plan. For instance, the construction of masonry stands was not part of the initial plan as, originally, stands consisted of grassed terraces.

In 1937, the construction of a second tier of stairs was started but was interrupted in 1940 due to the outbreak of World War II.

1953, the Stadio dei Centomila 

In December 1950, the working site was reopened for the completion of the stadium. The project was entrusted to the engineer Carlo Roccatelli, a member of the Superior Council of Public Works. At first, the plan was for a stadium with a more complex structure than that actually realised. However, the scarcity of funds and the environmental characteristics of the area led to a less ambitious building. On the death of Roccatelli in 1951, the direction of the work was entrusted to architect Annibale Vitellozzi. The stadium now reached a capacity of about 100,000 people, hence the stadium was known as Stadio dei Centomila, until renamed for the 1960 Olympics. The building was inaugurated on 17 May 1953 with a football game between Italy and Hungary. Hungary won the game, 3–0.

1960, the Stadio Olimpico 

During the 1960 Summer Olympics, the stadium hosted the opening and closing ceremonies and the athletics competitions. Seating at ground level was eliminated with the result of an actual capacity of 65,000 spectators. Subsequently, the stadium hosted several editions of the Italian Championships of Athletics, the 1975 Summer Universiade (the stadium was the only venue for the Universiade) and the 1987 World Athletics Championships. It still hosts the annual meeting of the Golden Gala.

1990 restructuring and roofing of the stadium 

For the 1990 FIFA World Cup, for which it was the main stadium, the facility underwent an extensive renovation. While that work was underway in 1989 the Capitoline teams Lazio and Roma had to play their Serie A games at Stadio Flaminio. The work was entrusted to a team of designers including the original architect Annibale Vitellozzi. From 1987 to 1990, the construction plan was amended several times, with a consequent rise in costs. Ultimately, the Olimpico was entirely demolished and rebuilt in reinforced concrete, with the exception of the Tribuna Tevere which was expanded with the addition of further steps and of the curves which were closer to the field by nine metres. All sectors of the stadium were provided with full coverage in tensostructure white. Backless seats in blue plastic were installed and two giant screens built in 1987 for the World Athletics Championships were also mounted inside the curve. In the end the new version of the Olimpico had 82,911 seats. It was the 14th stadium in the world for number of seats among the football stadiums, the 29th among all stadiums and the second in Italy, just behind the San Siro Stadium of Milan.

The Stadio Olimpico hosted five matches that the Italian national team took part and the final between West Germany and Argentina. West Germany won the final match 1–0.

With the same layout from 1990, the Stadio Olimpico hosted on 22 May 1996 the UEFA Champions League Final between Juventus and Ajax which saw the Bianconeri prevail in a penalty shoot-out.

2008 restyling of the stadium 

In 2007, a vast plan of restyling the internal design of the stadium was laid out, to conform to UEFA standards for the 2009 UEFA Champions League Final which was held in Rome. The work was performed and completed in 2008. It included the establishment of standard structures with improvements in security, the fixing of dressing rooms and of the press room. It also included the replacement of all seats, the installation of high definition LED screens, the partial removal of plexiglas fences between spectators and the field and a reduction of seating to the current capacity of 70,634. In order to enhance the comfort of the audience, part of the modernisation of the stadium involved increasing the number of restrooms and fixing the toilets. As a result of these improvements, the Stadio Olimpico was classified a UEFA Elite stadium.

Areas and capacity 

The stadium has a current capacity of 72,698, distributed as follows:

Tribuna Monte Mario – 16,555
Tribuna Tevere – 16,397
Distinti Sud Ovest – 5,747
Distinti Sud Est – 5,637
Distinti Nord Ovest – 5,769
Distinti Nord Est – 5,597
Curva Sud – 8,486
Curva Nord – 8,520
 For end stage concerts/shows it can hold up to 75,000.
 For center stage concerts/shows it can hold up to 78,000.

Competitions hosted
 1960 Summer Olympics
 UEFA Euro 1968
 1974 European Athletics Championships
 1975 Summer Universiade
 1977 European Cup Final
 UEFA Euro 1980
 1984 European Cup Final
 1987 World Championships in Athletics
 1990 FIFA World Cup
 1996 UEFA Champions League Final
 2001 Summer Deaflympics
 2009 UEFA Champions League Final
 UEFA Euro 2020
 2024 European Athletics Championships

Famous matches 

 The 1968 European Championship final match saw Italy win against Yugoslavia 2–0.
 The 1973 Intercontinental Cup match saw Independiente win the trophy against Juventus 1-0
 The 1977 European Cup Final match saw Liverpool win the trophy against Borussia Mönchengladbach 3–1.
 The 1980 European Championship final match saw Germany win against Belgium 2–1.
 The 1984 European Cup Final match saw Liverpool win the trophy after a penalty shootout against native team Roma (regular time ended 1–1).
 The 1990 FIFA World Cup Final match saw West Germany win against Argentina 1–0.
 The 1996 UEFA Champions League Final saw Juventus win the trophy after a penalty shootout against Ajax (regular time ended 1–1).
 The 2009 UEFA Champions League Final saw Barcelona win against Manchester United 2–0.
 The 2013 Six Nations Championship saw the Italian rugby team beat France for only the second time in the championship and the first time at this stadium.
 The 2013 Six Nations Championship saw the Italian rugby team beat Ireland for the first time ever in the championship.

Average attendances

The average season attendance at league matches held at the Stadio Olimpico for Lazio and Roma.

# In 1989–90 season both teams played at Stadio Flaminio during the renovations of Stadio Olimpico.
* Club was in Serie B 
 = Serie A champions 
 = Coppa Italia winners

Notable international football matches

UEFA Euro 1968
The stadium was one of the venues of the UEFA Euro 1968, and held three matches.

UEFA Euro 1980
The stadium was one of the venues of the UEFA Euro 1980, and held four matches.

1990 FIFA World Cup
The stadium was one of the venues of the 1990 FIFA World Cup, and held six matches.

UEFA Euro 2020
The stadium was one of the venues of the UEFA Euro 2020, and hosted four matches.

Concerts

References

External links

 External view of the Olympic Stadium of Rome
 Rome2009.net
 Brief Guide to Olympic Stadium of Rome
 How to reach the Olympic Stadium of Rome

Football venues in Italy
Serie A venues
Sports venues in Rome
S.S. Lazio
A.S. Roma
1990 FIFA World Cup stadiums
UEFA Euro 1968 stadiums
Rugby union stadiums in Italy
Roma
Venues of the 1960 Summer Olympics
Olympic athletics venues
Athletics (track and field) venues in Italy
Modernist architecture in Italy
UEFA Euro 1980 stadiums
UEFA Euro 2020 stadiums
Rome Q. XV Della Vittoria
Sports venues completed in 1937
UEFA European Championship final stadiums
1937 establishments in Italy
Diamond League venues